The Joker is Wild was the second album released by Alex Harvey after the demise of The Soul Band. The album was released in 1972. Some time after 1972 the album The Joker Is Wild was reissued and repackaged, the album song listings stayed the same, but the album was credited as being made by The Sensational Alex Harvey Band even though this band did not exist at the time, and the title was changed to This Is.

Background
The album was recorded at Regent Sound Studio, London in early 1972. These songs are unfinished demos only, recorded for a Spanish singer named Tony Caldeira (who wrote "The Joker Is Wild" and "Silhouette and Shadow"). Alex was teaching Tony vocal delivery and phrasing. Alex received a cheque for the session which subsequently bounced. The producer, Paul Murphy, sold the tapes to Metronome Records in Germany and they issued the LP as The Joker Is Wild in 1972. This Is SAHB is a low budget reissue of "Joker" intended to cash in on SAHB's success (even though Zal, Chris, Ted and Hugh weren't involved with the recordings). The photo of SAHB on the sleeve features keyboard player John Martin on the far left.

Leslie Harvey, brother of Alex Harvey, plays guitar on this session. "He Ain't Heavy, He's My Brother" is not a tribute to Leslie, who was electrocuted on stage at the Swansea Top Rank Ballroom on 3 May 1972 while playing with Stone The Crows. Alex recorded this song because he used to hang out with members of The Hollies in the 1960s.

Jim Condron and George Butler were members of Harvey's flower-power band Giant Moth in 1967. Although they never recorded under this name, they did release two singles for Decca under Alex's own name. They were "The Sunday Song/Horizons" (1967 Decca F12640) and "Maybe Someday/Curtains For My Baby" (1967 Decca F12660). Harvey and Condron co-wrote the song "There's No Lights On The Christmas Tree, Mother, They're Burning Big Louie Tonight" which Alex went on to record with the Hairband in 1969 and with SAHB in 1972.

Track listing
Side A:
"The Joker Is Wild" (Tony Caldeira) – 2:07
"Penicillin Blues" (Alex Harvey) – 4:58
"Make Love to You" (Alex Harvey) – 3:23
"I'm Just a Man" (Larry Santos) – 3:12
"He Ain't Heavy, He's My Brother" (Bob Scott, Bob Russell) – 5:05
 
Side B:
"Silhouette and Shadow" (Tony Caldeira) – 2:07
"Hare Krishna"/"Willie the Pimp" (Frank Zappa) – 12:23
"Flying Saucer's Daughter" (Alex Harvey, Paul Murphy) – 4:50

Personnel

Musicians
 Alex Harvey  – guitar, vocals
 Leslie Harvey  – guitar
 Pete Kelly  – piano
 Stephen Allan  – engineer, synthesizer, sound effects on "Flying Saucer's Daughter"
 Jim Condron  – bass guitar
 George Butler  – drums

Technical
 Paul Murphy – producer
 J.H. Löffler  – design

1972 albums
Alex Harvey (musician) albums